Lord Tariq and Peter Gunz were an American hip hop duo, composed of rappers Sean "Lord Tariq" Hamilton and Peter "Peter Gunz" Pankey, from The Bronx, New York. They are best known for their 1997 single "Deja Vu (Uptown Baby)", which reached the top ten on the US Billboard Hot 100.

Career
Initially performing as The Gunrunners, the duo made their debut on Whodini's 1996 album Six, on which they featured on the track "Can't Get Enough" and assisted in the writing of two other tracks. Peter Gunz collaborated with Shaquille O'Neal on the latter's albums You Can't Stop the Reign (1996) and Respect (1998), in addition to the single "Men of Steel" from O'Neal's film Steel (1997). Lord Tariq worked with Jay-Z and Nas on the 1998 single "Analyze This".

Their debut single, "Deja Vu (Uptown Baby)", was released in December 1997 and sampled the 1977 Steely Dan song "Black Cow". It peaked at #9 on the Billboard Hot 100, topped the Billboard Hot Rap Songs chart, and reached #21 on the UK Singles Chart in May 1998. The single was certified platinum by the RIAA for sales of over one million.

Following the track's success, Lord Tariq and Peter Gunz released their only album in 1998, Make It Reign, which peaked at #38 on the Billboard 200 and #8 on the Billboard Top R&B/Hip-Hop Albums charts. Despite containing guest appearances by Big Pun, Fat Joe, Sticky Fingaz, Kurupt and Cam'ron, the album failed to produce further hits.

The pair broke up in 1999 without releasing any other material.

Later career
Since 2013, Peter Gunz has appeared on the VH1 reality series Love & Hip Hop: New York and is currently (as of late 2020) the new host of the long running reality series Cheaters. He is married to singer Amina Schmahl. His son, Peter Cory Pankey, Jr. (born 1987), is a rapper who goes by the stage name of Cory Gunz and is currently signed to Young Money Entertainment.

In June 2005, Lord Tariq released a non-charting solo album, The Barcode, that featured both Peter and Cory Gunz.

Discography

Lord Tariq & Peter Gunz

Lord Tariq

Filmography

Peter Gunz

Personal life

Peter Gunz

As of 2015, Peter Gunz had ten children: Cory, Whitney, Kennedi, Brandon, Phoenix, Jamison, Kaz, Cori, Gunner, and Bronx. Peter has one granddaughter.

References

External links

African-American musical groups
American musical duos
Columbia Records artists
Hip hop duos
Hip hop groups from New York City
Musical groups established in 1996
Musical groups disestablished in 1999
Musical groups from the Bronx
Rappers from the Bronx
Participants in American reality television series